Fundidora Park (Parque Fundidora in Spanish)  is an urban park located in the Mexican city of Monterrey, built in what once were the grounds of the Monterrey Foundry, the first steel and iron foundry in Latin America, and, for many years, the most important one in the region.

History and location

The Parque Fundidora is located inside the grounds formerly occupied by Fundidora Monterrey, a steel foundry company of great importance to the economic development of the city during the 20th century. After its bankruptcy in 1986, Federal and State government showed interest in using the land to create a public park with the aim to preserve its history as well as being a center of culture, business, entertainment and ecological awareness for the people of the city. In 1988 the land was expropriated and the Fideicomiso Fundidora (Fundidora Trust) was created to manage it in an arrangement between the State government and private investment. Construction began in 1989, starting with the preservation of historically important buildings and structures within the foundry and the dismantling of the others, followed by the construction of the CINTERMEX convention center, Plaza Sesamo amusement park, a hotel and a cinematheque. Construction and rehabilitation continued during the rest of the 1990s.

Buildings

Monterrey Arena

Arena Monterrey is an indoor arena in Monterrey, Mexico. It is primarily used for concerts, shows and indoor sports like indoor soccer or basketball. It used to be the home arena of the Monterrey Fury indoor soccer team and the Fuerza Regia, a professional basketball team in the Liga Nacional de Baloncesto Profesional and the Monterrey La Raza, a team in the NISL.

The Arena Monterrey is owned by Publimax S.A. de C.V. (TV Azteca Northeast), part of the Avalanz Group, who owns 80% and by TV Azteca who owns 20%. The arena is 480,000 square feet (45,000 m) in size.

Cintermex

Parque Fiesta Aventuras

Parque Fiesta Aventuras (formerly Parque Plaza Sésamo) is a theme park located in the complex that originally opened in 1995. The park was operated under a license from Sesame Workshop, the owners of Sesame Street and Plaza Sésamo.

On May 18, 2022, the park announced that it would rebrand as Parque Fiesta Aventuras for the 2022 season following a two-year period of closure. The reason for the rebranding was not classified by the park, but is likely that the owners had terminated the license to use the Plaza Sésamo branding and characters.

Auditorio Banamex

Auditorio Citibanamex (formerly named Auditorio Coca-Cola, Auditorio Fundidora and Auditorio Banamex) is an indoor amphitheatre with a capacity of 8,200.
The amphitheatre opened in 1994 with a sponsorship by The Coca-Cola Company, and it was the primary venue for concerts until the Arena Monterrey opened in 2003.

Centro de las Artes

Museo de Acero

Visualscapes

Events

 The Champ Car World Series Grand Prix of Monterrey was held from 2001 to 2006 (see Tecate/Telmex Grand Prix of Monterrey).
 Fundidora Park has been the venue of UN and OEA summits.
 On February 26, 2006, the Fundidora Park raceway hosted the 2005–06 A1 Grand Prix of Nations, Mexico in A1 Grand Prix racing series.
 The park was the center of the 2007 Universal Forum of Cultures.
 The Pal Norte music fest and the Machaca Fest are hosted in the park every year.

Champ Car race history

A1GP race history

Lap records

See also
 List of preserved historic blast furnaces
 Enrique Abaroa Castellanos

References

External links

 Fundidora Park official website
 Mabe Fundidora Ice Rink: localized at Fundidora Park, Monterrey, Nuevo León
 Centro de las Artes CONARTE
 Fundidora Park Slideshow

Buildings and structures in Monterrey
Champ Car circuits
Parks in Mexico
A1 Grand Prix circuits
Tourist attractions in Monterrey
Blast furnaces